Madagascar competed at the 2012 Summer Olympics in London, United Kingdom from 27 July to 12 August 2012. This was the nation's eleventh appearance at the Olympics, excluding the 1976 Summer Olympics in Montreal and the 1988 Summer Olympics in Seoul, because of the African and North Korean boycott.

Comité Olympique Malgache sent a total of 7 athletes to the Games, 3 men and 4 women, to compete in 5 sports. For the second time in Olympic history, Madagascar was represented by more female than male athletes. Judoka and Olympic qualifier Fetra Ratsimiziva was the nation's flag bearer at the opening ceremony. Among the five sports played by the athletes, Madagascar also marked its Olympic debut in freestyle wrestling. Madagascar, however, has yet to win its first ever Olympic medal.

Athletics 

Men

Women

Judo

Swimming

Men

Women

Weightlifting

Madagascar has achieved the following quota place.

Wrestling

Madagascar has qualified one quota place.

Women's freestyle

References

External links
 
 

Nations at the 2012 Summer Olympics
2012
Olympics